ICAT can refer to:

 iCat, a robot toy
 ICAT Design & Media College, Chennai, Tamil Nadu, India
 International Center for Automotive Technology, Manesar, Haryana, India
 International Coalition Against Terrorism
 Isotope-coded affinity tag, a method for quantitative proteomics
 A radio station from Catalunya Ràdio.
 Another name for the protein CTNNBIP1